To Shiver the Sky is the third studio album by the American composer Christopher Tin. Released in 2020, it features texts about the history of flight ranging from Leonardo da Vinci's writings on flight to John F. Kennedy's "We choose to go to the Moon" speech.

Creation of the album was funded by a Kickstarter campaign. The campaign met its goal in the first 36 hours, and went on to raise $221,415 (over 4 times the initial goal), making it the highest funded classical music Kickstarter project ever.

The song "Sogno di Volare" was composed as a main theme for the 2016 video game Civilization VI.

Track listing

Charts
To Shiver the Sky first spent two weeks on Billboard Top Classical Crossover Albums, peaking at rank 1 the week of 5 September 2020. That same week it placed 6 on Top Classical Albums and 80 for Current Album Sales. It re-entered the Top Classical Crossover Albums chart for a third week the week of October 3, 2020.

References

Further reading

 

2020 albums
Concept albums
Royal Philharmonic Orchestra albums
Kickstarter-funded albums
Albums about aircraft